Antonio Cerdà i Lloscos (1390 – 12 September 1459) (called the Cardinal of Messina or the Cardinal of Lleida (a.k.a. Lérida)) was a Spanish Roman Catholic bishop and cardinal.

Biography

Antonio Cerdà i Lloscos was born in Santa Margalida in 1390.  He studied humanities at Palma, Majorca and then attended the University of Lleida, receiving a doctorate in Christian theology.

After he was ordained as a priest, he became a canon of Palma Cathedral.  He joined the Trinitarian Order at the monastery of the Holy Spirit in Mallorca.  He later became professor of moral theology, Scholastic theology, Sacred Scripture, and canon law at the University of Lleida.  As first definitor of the Trinitarian Order, he attended the General Chapter of the order held in Amiens on April 4, 1429.  After redacting the Trinitarian Order's new constitutions, he spent two years visiting the Trinitarian convents in the Kingdom of England, the Lordship of Ireland, and the Kingdom of Scotland, and later in Spain and Italy as well.  The Roman Curia then named him procurator general of his order.

Pope Eugene IV brought Cerdà into the papal household, making him his privy chamberlain.  He soon became auditor of the Roman Rota.  Pope Nicholas V later named him as the pope's counselor in matters of theology and philosophy.

Upon the recommendation of Alfonso V of Aragon, he was elected Archbishop of Messina on July 8, 1447, with Pope Nicholas V confirming the election on January 8, 1448.  He also became commendatory abbot of Valldigna.  Bishop Cerdà did not participate in the Council of Florence (1431–49).

Pope Nicholas V made Cerdà a cardinal in the consistory of February 16, 1448.  He received the red hat and the titular church of San Crisogono on February 17, 1448.

He was translated to the see of Lleida on March 28, 1449; he took possession of the see by a procurator and continued to reside in Rome.  On April 29, 1449, he resigned as commendatory abbot of Valldigna.  He attended the secret consistory of October 27, 1451, and later participated in the papal conclave of 1455 that elected Pope Callixtus III.

He served as apostolic administrator of the see of Giovinazzo from June 6, 1455 until 1458, and as administrator of the Archdiocese of Ravenna from June 28, 1455.  He served as Camerlengo of the Sacred College of Cardinals for the year 1456.  As legate in the Marche, he helped conclude the peace negotiations between the Republic of Florence and Alfonso V of Aragon.

He was present at the death of Pope Callixtus III on August 6, 1458.  He then participated in the papal conclave of 1458 that elected Pope Pius II.

He died in Rome on September 12, 1459.  He is buried in St. Peter's Basilica.

References

1390 births
1459 deaths
15th-century Spanish cardinals
Trinitarian bishops